Philip David Swing (November 30, 1884 – August 8, 1963) was an American Republican politician from Imperial County, California. He served six terms in the United States House of Representatives from 1921 to 1933.



Biography
Swing was born 1884 in San Bernardino, California to James and Mary Swing.  He attended the public schools and graduated in 1905 from Stanford University.  He was a first lieutenant in the California National Guard during 1906–1908.  Swing studied law and was admitted to the bar in 1907.  He was city attorney of Brawley, California in 1908 and 1909, deputy district attorney of Imperial County 1908–1911, district attorney 1911–1915, chief counsel of the Imperial Irrigation District 1916–1919, and Judge of the Imperial County Superior Court 1919–1921.  During 1920–1932 Swing was delegate to the Republican State conventions at Sacramento, serving as chairman in 1926.  During World War I he served as a private in the Officers Training Camp in 1918.

Swing was married to Nell Cremeens in 1912.

Swing was first elected to the House of Representatives in 1920. He replaced William Kettner in representing the 11th District, which included both Imperial County and San Diego County.  He had a folksy manner and during his six terms, 1921–1933, as a progressive Republican, he focused on water issues. He worked especially hard to obtain water from the Colorado River by building Boulder Dam.  His single-minded determination resulted in 1928 in the Swing-Johnson Act, co-sponsored by Sen. Hiram Johnson, which authorized Boulder Dam.  This was in the face of opposition from the State of Arizona, private power companies, and bureaucratic inertia.  The project brought water to Southern California and enabled San Diego to grow and prosper.

In 1932 he chose not to run for re-election, and joined a law firm in San Diego.  In 1933, as one of his last acts in Congress, he introduced a bill to establish Anza-Borrego Desert State Park, which passed in March.

In 1945, Swing was appointed a member of the California State Water Resources Board, serving until 1958.

Swing died 1963 in San Diego and is buried at Greenwood Memorial Park.  A water fountain at the Community Concourse at Third and C Streets is dedicated to Phil Swing, "The Father of Boulder Dam."

See also
 Philip David Swing Papers, UCLA Research Library
 Phil Swing and Boulder Dam (UC Press, 1971) by Beverly B. Moeller. Also her Ph.D. dissertation, UCLA 1968.
  Biography, pp. 147–148; includes portrait

External links
 
 Biography (San Diego Historical Society)
 "Chapter 1: Envy of Cities" and "Chapter 6: The Boom Fades", History of San Diego (1967) by Richard Pourade. Covers Swing and Boulder Dam history
 

1884 births
1963 deaths
Politicians from San Diego
Republican Party members of the United States House of Representatives from California
20th-century American politicians
Burials at Greenwood Memorial Park (San Diego)
People from Imperial County, California
Politicians from San Bernardino, California
California National Guard personnel
National Guard (United States) officers
United States Army personnel of World War I
United States Army soldiers